George Harrison Mifflin (1845 - 1921) was an executive in the publishing business. He served as president of Houghton Mifflin. 

Mifflin was born in Boston. He graduated from Harvard. He joined Hurd and Houghton  in 1867 and worked for its subsidiary Riverside Press. He partnered with Henry Oscar Houghton in 1872. 

Houghton died in 1895 and Mifflin took over leadership of the company. He communicated with some of its prominent authors through good times and bad.

Mifflin was at first skeptical of the company's investment in educational publishing. He was socially connected to Sarah Wyman Whitman, who designed elegant book covers for the business.

He died in Boston at aged 75.

Further reading
The Building of the House: Houghton Mifflin ’s Formative Years by Ellen B. Ballou, Houghton Mifflin, Boston, 1970
"George H. Mifflin", Cambridge Tribune XLIV.6 April 9, 1921

References

1845 births
American business executives
People from Boston
1921 deaths
Harvard College alumni